Nelson is a town and civil parish in the Borough of Pendle in Lancashire, England, with a population of 29,135 in 2011. It is 4 miles (6.4 km) north of Burnley and 2.5 miles southwest of Colne.

It developed as a mill town during the Industrial Revolution, but has today lost much of its industry and is characterised by some of the lowest house prices in the whole of the United Kingdom.

History

An Iron Age hillfort called Castercliff is on a hill to the east of the town. The modern town spans the two parts of the township of Marsden in the ancient parish of Whalley. Little Marsden was on the southwest of Walverden Water, its lands considered part of the manor of Ightenhill and Great Marsden to the northeast, part of the manor of Colne. Great Marsden included the southern parts of Colne, and Little Marsden included all of modern-day Brierfield. Walverden Water joins Pendle Water next to Nelson & Colne College, with that river forming the boundary of the Forest of Pendle. Both the manors and forest were parts of the Honour of Clitheroe. The lord of Clitheroe had a mill on the river in 1311, thought to have been sited near the confluence with Clough Head Beck, where Scholefield Mill now stands. There is also evidence of an ancient fulling mill further upstream. A small chapel is thought to have been built during the reign of Henry VIII on the site of St Paul's Church.

The forest of Pendle was made famous by the Pendle witch trials of 1612. One of the accused in the less well-known witch trials of 1634, Margaret Johnson, confessed that she first met her familiar in Marsden.

A small mill had been established by the Ecroyd family at Edge End as early as 1740, and they started Lomeshaye Mill as a water-powered spinning mill in 1780. The coming of the Leeds and Liverpool Canal in 1796, followed by the East Lancashire Railway Line in 1849, spurred its development as an industrial town, with an economy based mainly upon cotton weaving. The first Ordnance Survey map of the area, published in 1848, shows three small villages: Marsden (around St Paul's), and Hebson and Bradley, both on Walverden Water in the modern-day centre of town. Also apparent are the estates of Marsden Hall to the east and Carr Hall across Pendle Water to the northwest, as well as the turnpike roads of the Marsden, Gisburn and Long Preston trust (Scotland Road) heading north, and the Blackburn, Addingham and Cocking End trust (Manchester Road) heading east.
Brierfield railway station was originally called Marsden, and Nelson railway station was known as the Nelson Inn station, Great Marsden, after the adjacent public house, the Lord Nelson Inn (named after Admiral Lord Nelson). As the villages developed into a town, the name Nelson was chosen to differentiate it from Marsden across the Pennines in the neighbouring county of Yorkshire (West Riding).

There was a worsted mill at Lomeshaye close to a "cotton factory" and another cotton mill along the canal at Reedyford by 1848. Walverden Mill in Leeds Road was built in 1850, and it was soon followed by others. From 1862, Phoenix Foundry, the steam engine factory of William Roberts, stood at the site of the shopping centre's car park, and has been called "Nelson's most significant engineering site". By 1891, there were 57 cotton spinners and manufacturers listed in Nelson. The largest had 1,950 looms and the smallest only eight. The cotton industry was the most important in the town, and by 1910, more than 12,000 local workers were members of the Nelson and District Power-Loom Weavers' Association.

Nelson is considered part of the Burnley Coalfield. There is evidence of old bell pits and surface mining at Swinden Clough and Castercliff, and as early as 1465 there was a complaint of people unlawfully digging coal in the area. Clough Head Colliery, also known as Town House Pit, was on Clough Head Beck on the eastern edge of the town and it had a troubled history. While under construction in 1845, an accident during assembly of the steam pumping engine resulted in the death of one worker. On 12 April 1850, six men were working in the pit when one man went to check for gas with a safety lamp, but before he had signalled it was safe, another man opened his lamp causing an explosion that killed them all. Another explosion in November 1856 resulted in two fatalities. A surface tramroad connected it to railway sidings at Bradley Lane Head. It is uncertain when the colliery closed, but it was possibly in the late 1880s.

The town became associated in the 20th century with the production of confectionery, including Jelly Babies and Victory V, and it was where the package holiday company Airtours (formerly Pendle Travel and now part of Thomas Cook) began life as an independent travel agent. The textile industry, in particular, has now sharply declined, leaving the town with low property prices and higher than average unemployment.

Governance
Nelson was granted its charter of incorporation as a municipal borough by Queen Victoria in 1890.  Radical left wing politics in the early 20th century led to it being labelled "Little Moscow" by both the local and national press; indeed, the Nelson Leader ran the headline "Moscow calling" during the lock-out of 1928. There was significant Communist Party influence in the town between the wars. When the Labour Party came to power in the town, they responded to local political feeling by placing utilities such as gas and water under the control of the municipal council, anticipating by decades the nationalisation of such utilities after World War II. The council refused, moreover, to participate in celebrations for King George V's silver jubilee in 1935, saying that they would rather spend public money on free dinners for school children and the jobless.

Under the Local Government Act 1972, the town became part of the non-metropolitan district of Pendle on 1 April 1974. Initially forming part of an unparished area, a new Nelson civil parish was formed in 2008, covering a similar area to the old municipal borough. It currently has three tiers of local government, Lancashire County Council, Pendle Borough Council and a town council, with 24 councillors, which was elected for the first time on 1 May 2008. Nelson Town Council and the wider Pendle Borough Council are situated at Nelson Town Hall on Market Square.

After boundary changes in 2020 which reduced the number of wards in the borough to 12, four cover parts of Nelson parish – Bradley, Brierfield East & Clover Hill, Marsden & Southfield and Whitefield & Walverden. Pendle Borough Council is currently under 'No Overall Control' and governed by a coalition of the Labour and Liberal Democrats, led by Councillor Mohammed Iqbal. The mayor is a ceremonial post, rotated annually.
 
Lancashire County Council was governed from 1994 to 2009 by Labour, at which point it switched to Conservative control, then to no overall control in 2013, and back to Conservative in 2017. The town is represented on the council in three divisions: Brierfield & Nelson North, Nelson South, and Pendle Central.

The Member of Parliament for Pendle, the constituency into which the town falls, is Andrew Stephenson (Conservative), who was first elected in 2010.

Demography

The United Kingdom Census 2011 showed a total resident population for Nelson civil parish of 29,135. The town forms part of the wider urban area, which had a population of 149,796 in 2001. A similar but larger, Burnley Built-up area defined in the 2011 census had a population of 149,422.

The racial composition of the town in 2011 was 57.8% White (53.4% White British), 40.4% Asian, 0.1% Black, 1.5% Mixed and 0.2% Other. The largest religious groups are Christian (39.0%) and Muslim (37.6%). 59.9% of adults between the ages of 16 and 74 are classed as economically active and in work.

Economy

The town centre contains the largest number of high street multiples of any town in the Borough of Pendle. Stores currently include: Boots, Wilko, Specsavers, Home Bargains, Peacocks, Costa Coffee, Greggs, Post Office, and Martin McColl.

The Pendle Rise Shopping Centre has been the focal point of the town centre for over 50 years. It opened as the Arndale Centre in June 1967 and was rebranded as the Admiral Shopping Centre before taking its current name. Nelson Market (previously Admiral's Market) is a covered market below the Pendle Rise Shopping Centre. The Victory Centre opened on the site of the former Salem Chapel in 1993. Of the 12 units only one remained occupied in 2017, by a branch of William Hill.

The main road through the town centre, pedestrianised in the early 1990s, was reopened to traffic in August 2011, to help boost trade. In 2012, Nelson was among twelve English towns chosen to participate in the Portas Pilot Areas initiative, receiving £100,000 to help rejuvenate the shopping area.

The largest business park in the town is located at Lomeshaye, by Junction 12 of the M65. The original 15-hectare site was designated as an Enterprise Zone on 7 December 1983. The estate currently occupies 53 hectares and is home to over 80 businesses. Between them they employ approximately 4,000 people on the estate. A 31-hectare site was taken out of the Green Belt when the Council's new Local Plan was adopted in December 2015, in order to facilitate a further extension to the west and north. The Lomeshaye Business Village, a refurbished former cotton mill to the east of the estate, contains a further 151 units, principally occupied by small and medium-sized enterprises engaged in office and light industrial uses.

Transport

Nelson is served by Junction 13 of the M65 motorway, which runs west to Burnley, Accrington, Blackburn and Preston, and northeast to Colne. From the town centre, the A56 runs southwest to the M65 at Brierfield and northeast to Colne and beyond, while the A682 – Britain's most dangerous road – heads north into the Yorkshire Dales.

In November 1969, a multi-storey car park with space for 350 cars was opened in Nelson. The car park was demolished in 2019 to make way for a McDonalds, but this deal has since fallen through, leaving an empty lot. 

In December 2008, the town's new bus and rail interchange was opened at a site which used the existing railway station. The new interchange facility cost £4.5 million and included enhancements such as cycle stands, taxi and car drop off facilities, electronic information displays, a direct link to the railway station including a passenger lift and an enclosed passenger concourse with 10 bus stands.

Rail services to and from Nelson are provided by Northern. The Interchange has an hourly stopping service 7 days a week west to Blackpool South via Blackburn and Preston, and east to Colne.

The main bus operator in Nelson is Burnley Bus Company, although Tyrer Bus, Boomerang and Holmeswood operate some services. National Express operates one coach service to London Victoria Coach Station each day from the Interchange. The town has good bus links into Burnley with peak hour services on to Manchester: X43 Witch Way service (operated by Burnley Bus Company) runs from Burnley and Rawtenstall to Manchester city centre, using a fleet of specially-branded double-decker buses with leather seats and WiFi. Some early morning X43 journeys to/from Manchester start and end at Nelson instead of Burnley.

Sports
The town is home to Nelson F.C., who were Football League members from 1921 until 1931 and played in the lower semi-professional leagues until resigning from the North West Counties League in 2010 (returning in 2011), and to Nelson Cricket Club. Nelson F.C were the first English team to beat Real Madrid, and did this in Spain. Cricket was particularly popular in the town during the inter-war period, when the club enjoyed the services of Learie Constantine, the West Indian cricketer; when in 1969 Constantine became the first person of African descent to be given a life peerage, he chose to be gazetted as Baron Constantine, of Maraval in Trinidad and Tobago and of Nelson in the County Palatine of Lancaster.

Speedway racing was staged at Seedhill Stadium from 1967 to 1970. The Nelson Admirals were founder members of the British League Division Two.) The team later moved embloc to Odsal Stadium, Bradford. The track was also used for stock car racing.

The town also has two golf clubs, a municipal at Marsden Park and a private club in Kings Causeway known simply as Nelson Golf Club.

Also in Nelson there is Nelson Archery Club and Nelson Wrestling Club which are clubs affiliated to the National Governing Bodies Archery GB and the British Wrestling Association respectively.

Recreation

The town is home to several parks the most notable of which are Victoria Park and Marsden Park. The recently opened Arts, Culture and Enterprise Centre (The ACE Centre)  provides the residents with a new multi-purpose venue and incorporates a cinema, theatre and bistro.
The Heritage Trust for the North West have numerous campaigns and projects in the area. One of which has seen the restoration and conservation of a whole street of Victorian workers housing, a former primary school and cotton mill, as it was feared that the Industrial Heritage of the town was at risk. St Mary's Church is also another major project in the town, which is planned to open as an exhibition centre in Summer 2012.

Media
Nelson along with the neighbouring town of Colne are mentioned in the 1991 song, It's Grim Up North by the band KLF.
 
Local radio for Nelson is currently provided by 2BR and BBC Radio Lancashire, and – since September 2007 – by community radio service Pendle Community Radio, aimed primarily at the local Asian community. There are two local newspapers: the Nelson Leader, published on Fridays, and the daily Lancashire Telegraph, which publishes a local edition for Burnley and Pendle.

Notable people

George Faucett Pitts Abbott (1897−1977), GC, British sailor during WWI.
Margaret Aldersley (1852−1940), suffragist and feminist lived and campaigned in the town
Bernie Calvert (born 1944), musician, The Hollies
Learie Constantine (1901−1971), a West Indian cricketer, lawyer and politician who played for Nelson cricket club with great distinction between 1929 and 1938
Sir Frank Hartley CBE, (pharmacist) (1911−1997), Vice-Chancellor, University of London 1976–78
Tony Hicks (born 1945), musician, The Hollies
Jimmy Hogan (1882−1974), footballer and manager 
C. L. R. James (1901−1989), author, intellectual and writer on cricket, lived in Nelson before moving to London
Ted Koppel (born 1940), British-American broadcast journalist, was born in Nelson
Eric Knowles (born 19 February 1953), is a British antiques expert whose main interest is in ceramics
Graham Thomson Lyall (1892−1941), English-born officer in the Canadian army and Victoria Cross winner, lived in Nelson for twelve years, 1900−1912.
Mike Phelan (born 1962), footballer and coach 
John Pickles, distinguished professor of geography, University of North Carolina, USA
John Simm (born 1970), actor
Albert Smith (1867−1942), MP, trade unionist, Justice of the Peace and Captain in the British Army during WWI.
Kevin Smith (born 1954), entrepreneur
Duncan Spencer (born 1972), cricketer
Kathryn Stott (born 1958), classical pianist
Thomas Stuttard Tattersall EM, recipient of the Edward Medal in silver during WWI.
Harold Whalley (1923–1997), professional footballer
Nicola Wheeler (born 1974), Actress currently starring in Emmerdale lived in Nelson and went to Walton High School.

See also

Listed buildings in Nelson, Lancashire
Nelson Corporation Tramways
Nelson power station

References

Notes

Citations

Bibliography

External links

 
 

 
Towns and villages in the Borough of Pendle
Civil parishes in Lancashire
Towns in Lancashire